Napoleón Nelson Pinedo Fedullo (10 February 1928 – 27 October 2016) was a singer from Barranquilla, Colombia. In 1954, Pinedo began a five-year career with the Sonora Matancera, a Cuban ensemble, which at the time had widespread fame in Latin America. He incorporated various Colombian songs (porros, cumbias, and mapalés) into the band's repertoire— many of which were adapted to Cuban rhythms such as the Bolero.

Death 

Two weeks after suffering a stroke, Pinedo died in Valencia, Venezuela, on 27 October 2016 at the age of 88.

Discography 

 Una Noche en Caracas
 Nelson Pinedo Sings
 Sonora Matancera: Invite you to Dance
 Sonora Matancera: Desfile de Estrellas
 El Rítmico
 Cortijo Combo
 A Bailar Merecumbé Con Pacho Galán, con Pacho Galán y su Orquesta
 A Latin in América
 En Venezuela, con  "Chucho" Sanoja y su Orquesta
 ¿Quién Será?
 La Esquina del Movimiento
 Sale Caliente...Y Como Callao...

References 

 Fausto Pérez Villarreal. Nelson Pinedo: El Almirante Del Ritmo. Fundación Cultural Nueva Música, 2006.

1928 births
2016 deaths
People from Barranquilla
20th-century Colombian male singers
Colombian expatriates in Cuba